Pension Schöller is a 1930 German comedy film directed by Georg Jacoby and starring Paul Henckels, Elga Brink and Jakob Tiedtke. It is an adaptation of the 1890 play Pension Schöller by Wilhelm Jacoby and Carl Laufs. Georg Jacoby was Wilhem's son, and made three film adaptations of his father's best known play in 1930, 1952 and 1960.

The film's sets were designed by the art director Max Heilbronner.

Plot
The landowner and bachelor Philipp Klapproth, who finances his nephew Peter Klapproth's medical studies, receives a letter from him in which he asks his uncle for 20,000 marks which he wants to invest into construction of an insane asylum. The truth is, the nephew has completely different plans: He can neither see blood, nor has he ever studied medicine at all; instead, he and his music-loving friend Tommy dedicate themselves to their band with heart and soul. With the uncle's money, nothing would stand in the way of building a restaurant of his own. However, Philipp wants to examine the supposed institution before he gets the money out, and makes his way to Peter without further ado. In great need of explanation, he then follows Tommy's advice and leads his uncle to the Pension Schöller: "Peter's insane asylum". Their mystification fails. Peter suspects that something is not right.

Cast
Paul Henckels as director Schöller 
Elga Brink as Friedel 
Jakob Tiedtke as Philipp Klapproth 
Josefine Dora as Ulrike
Truus Van Aalten as Grete
Paul Heidemann as Dr. Alfred Klapproth 
Kurt Vespermann as Ernst Kissling 
Else Reval as Frau Pfeiffer 
Viktor de Kowa as Bernhardy 
Fritz Kampers as Gröber 
Hedwig Wangel as Fräulein Krüger 
Fritz Schulz as Jallings 
Trude Berliner as Fiffi 
Carl Geppert as minister

References

External links

German comedy films
Films directed by Georg Jacoby
German films based on plays
Films of the Weimar Republic
German black-and-white films
1930 comedy films
1930s German films